Club MTV was a 24-hour electronic dance music channel operated by ViacomCBS Networks UK & Australia launched on 20 April 2001. Available in the United Kingdom and Ireland on subscription satellite and digital television services. The channel played dance, EDM, trance, house, rave, club, Eurodance and sometimes urban music.

Concept and expansion
MTV Dance originally started out as a night-time programming slot on the now defunct digital music channel MTV Extra. It was on air each night from 7pm until the following morning.

On 3 September 2001, The strand expanded to become a standalone music channel broadcast on Sky in both the United Kingdom and Ireland, where it initially timeshared with Nick Jr. every evening between 19:00 and 06:00. The sharing of a stream subsequently ended; since 13 August 2002 MTV Dance has broadcast as a 24-hour music channel.

MTV Dance began broadcasting in widescreen on 6 March 2012.

Expansion around Europe

On 7 March 2008, MTV Dance increased its presence around Europe, when MTV Networks Europe replaced the Europe-wide feed of MTV Base with a similar feed of MTV Dance.

From 10 January 2011 a feed of the MTV Dance channel launched in Italy on Sky Italia, replacing MTV Pulse.
In 2014, MTV Dance, as well as MTV Rocks and MTV Hits started broadcasting European versions, without commercials or teleshopping.
MTV Dance Europe was rebranded as Club MTV in June 2020.

Expansion into Australia

VIMN launched the channel in Australia on 3 December 2013 as MTV Dance Australia, it shows the same programmes from the UK version, then rebranded as Club MTV in 2020.

Closure
This channel, along with its sister channels MTV OMG and MTV Rocks closed on 20 July 2020, with a chart based on the channel's former content airing on MTV Base. "High on Life" by Martin Garrix featuring Bonn was the last music video played on the channel.

MTV Dance Europe was later rebranded as the European version of Club MTV in June 2020, as was the Australian version a month later.

Logos

References

External links 
 Club MTV UK & Ireland – presentation, screenshots

TV Guide
SES guide to receiving Astra satellites
SES guide to channels broadcasting on Astra satellites

Defunct television channels in the United Kingdom
Dance music television channels
MTV channels
Music video networks in the United Kingdom
Television channels and stations established in 2001
Television channels and stations disestablished in 2020
2001 establishments in the United Kingdom
2020 disestablishments in the United Kingdom
Television channel articles with incorrect naming style